Frejlev is a satellite community just outside Aalborg, Denmark.

Notable people 

 Ellen Christensen (1913 in Frejlev – 1998) a Danish nurse who became a resistance fighter during the German occupation of Denmark in WWII
 Thomas Enevoldsen (1987 in Frejlev – ) a Danish former professional footballer

References
 

Cities and towns in the North Jutland Region
Towns and settlements in Aalborg Municipality